Elvin Berridge (born 11 February 1989) is a cricketer from Saint Kitts. He made his first-class debut for the Leeward Islands in the 2016–17 Regional Four Day Competition on 21 April 2017.

References

External links
 

1989 births
Living people
Kittitian cricketers
Leeward Islands cricketers
Place of birth missing (living people)